Alice Robbe (born 10 May 2000) is a French professional tennis player.

She has career-high WTA rankings of 641 in singles and 825 in doubles. Robbe has won one singles and three doubles titles on the ITF Circuit.

At the 2019 Summer Universiade held in Naples, Italy, she won the bronze medal in the mixed doubles competition, alongside Ronan Joncour.

ITF finals

Singles: 4 (1 title, 3 runner-ups)

Doubles: 8 (4 titles, 4 runner-ups)

References

External links
 
 

2000 births
Living people
French female tennis players
Universiade medalists in tennis
Universiade bronze medalists for France
Medalists at the 2019 Summer Universiade
21st-century French women